Ellsworth was a town in Hall Township, Dubois County, in the U.S. state of Indiana. It was abandoned in 1978 when the Patoka Reservoir was built, and it now lies at the bottom of the lake.

History
Ellsworth was platted in 1885. It is named for James M. Ellis, a landowner.

A post office was established at Ellsworth in 1878, and remained in operation until 1916.

Geography

Even though Ellsworth no longer exists, it is still cited by the USGS.

References

Ghost towns in Indiana
Jasper, Indiana micropolitan area